Tyranny is the debut studio album of the American pop/rock duo Stabilizers, released on Columbia Records in 1986.

Charts
The first single released from the album was “One Simple Thing”, which peaked at #21 on the Billboard Mainstream Rock Tracks chart in 1986 and charted at #93 on the Billboard Hot 100.

Track listing
"All songs written by Dave Christenson & Rich Nevens.  1986 Still Life Music and Warner-Tamerlane Publishing Corp. (BMI)"

Musicians

Stabilizers

Dave Christenson: Lead Vocals
Rich Nevens: Guitars, Keyboards, Keyboard programming, Drum programming, Percussion programming on track 5

Additional musicians

Robbie Buchanan: Keyboards, Keyboard Programming 
Casey Young: Keyboard Programming, Keyboard solo on track 4 
John "J.R." Robinson: Drums (tracks 3, 5, 6, and 7), Drum overdubs (all other tracks, except 8)
Tom Scott: Saxophone 
Nathan East: Bass (track 3)
Neil Stubenhaus: Bass (track 5)

References

Stabilizers albums
1986 debut albums
Columbia Records albums